Allt-fawr is a mountain in Snowdonia, North Wales and forms part of the Moelwynion group.

It is on the internal border of Snowdonia National Park, and overlooks the town of Blaenau Ffestiniog, with its numerous slate quarries, as well as Llyn Ystradau and Ffestiniog Power Station in Tanygrisiau. On the northern slope of Allt-fawr is the Oakeley Quarry, the world's largest underground slate mine. On the southern slope is the large Cwmorthin Quarry. These two mines are joined underneath the summit of Allt-fawr and the extensive chambering and adits are visible on the surface of the mountain where underground workings have collapsed.

Between 1974 and 1997, the Gloddfa Ganol tourist attraction operated within the Oakeley Quarry on the south slope of the mountain.

References

External links
www.geograph.co.uk : photos of Allt-fawr and surrounding area

Marilyns of Wales
Hewitts of Wales
Nuttalls
Mountains and hills of Gwynedd
Ffestiniog